The Domestic Science and Manual Training School (also known as the St. Petersburg City Hall Annex) is an historic school in St. Petersburg, Florida. It is located at 440-442 2nd Avenue North. On October 14, 1999, it was added to the U.S. National Register of Historic Places.

References

External links
 Pinellas County listings at National Register of Historic Places
 City Hall Annex at Florida's Office of Cultural and Historical Programs

National Register of Historic Places in Pinellas County, Florida
Education in St. Petersburg, Florida